Kawang Gewog (Dzongkha: ཀ་ཝང་) is a gewog (village block) of Thimphu District, Bhutan. As of 2005 it has a population of 2582 and covers an area of 307 square kilometres.

The district has 383 households.

References 

Gewogs of Bhutan
Thimphu District